The Iñupiat (or Inupiat, Iñupiaq or Inupiaq) are a group of indigenous Alaskans whose traditional territory roughly spans northeast from Norton Sound on the Bering Sea to the northernmost part of the Canada–United States border. Their current communities include 34 villages across Iñupiat Nunaat (Iñupiaq lands), including seven Alaskan villages in the North Slope Borough, affiliated with the Arctic Slope Regional Corporation; eleven villages in Northwest Arctic Borough; and sixteen villages affiliated with the Bering Straits Regional Corporation. They often claim to be the first people of the Kauwerak.

Name

Iñupiat is the plural form of the name for the people. The singular form is Iñupiaq, which also sometimes refers to the language.  Iñupiak is the dual form.  The roots are iñuk "person" and -piaq "real", i.e., an endonym meaning "real people".

Groups

Ethnic groups
The Iñupiat people are made up of the following communities

 Seward Peninsula Inupiat
 Nunamiut
 Northwest Arctic Iñupiat (Malimiut)
 North Alaska Coast Inupiat (Taġiuġmiut, people of the sea, or Siḷaliñiġmiut)

Regional corporations

In 1971, the Alaskan Native Claims Settlement Act established thirteen Alaskan Native Regional Corporations. The purpose of the regional corporations were to create institutions in which Native Alaskans would generate venues to provide services for its members, who were incorporated as "shareholders". Alaskan Native Regional Corporations pose many challenges as participation in extractive capitalism is often in conflict with Native Alaskans subsistence lifestyles that require the health of the ecosystems. Three regional corporations are located in the lands of the Iñupiat. These are the following.
 Arctic Slope Regional Corporation
 Bering Straits Native Corporation
 NANA Regional Corporation.

Tribal Governments 

Prior to colonization, the Iñupiat exercised sovereignty based on complex social structures and order. Despite the transfer of land from Russia to the U.S. and eventual annexation of Alaska, Iñupiat sovereignty continues to be articulated in various ways. A limited form of this sovereignty has been recognized by Federal Indian Law, which outlines the relationship between the federal government and American Indians. The Federal Indian Law recognized Tribal governments as having limited self-determination. In 1993, the federal government extended federal recognition to Alaskan Natives tribes.  Tribal governments created avenues for tribes to contract with the federal government to manage programs that directly benefit Native peoples. Throughout Iñupiat lands, there are various regional and village tribal governments. The tribal governments vary in structure and services provided, but often are related to the social wellbeing of the communities. Services included but are not limited to education, housing, tribal services, and supporting healthy families and cultural connection to place and community.

The following Alaska Native tribal entities for the Iñupiat are recognized by the United States Bureau of Indian Affairs:

Languages
Inuit, the language and the people, extend borders and dialects across the Circumpolar North. Inuit are the Native inhabitants of Northern Alaska, Canada, and Greenland. Inuit languages have differing names depending on the region it is spoken in. In Northern Alaskan, the Inuit language is called Iñupiat. Within Alaskan Iñupiat, there are four major dialects: North Slope, Malimiut, Bering Straits, and Qawiaraq.  Prior to western contact, the Iñupiat dialects flourished. Due to harsh assimilation efforts in Native American boarding schools, Natives were punished for speaking their language. Now only 2,000 of the approximately 24,500 Iñupiat people can speak their Native tongue.

Revitalization efforts have focused on Alaskan Native languages and ways of life. Located in Kotzebue, Alaska, an Iñupiat language immersion school called Nikaitchuat Iḷisaġviat was established in 1998. The immersion school's mission is to "instill the knowledge of Iñupiaq identity, dignity, respect and to cultivate a love of lifelong learning". June Nelson Elementary school is another school in Kotzebue that is working to include more content into their curriculum about Iñupiat language and culture.  Nome Elementary School in Nome, Alaska has also put in place plans to incororate an Iñupiaq language immersion program.  There are many courses being offered at the various campuses a part of the University of Alaska system. University of Alaska Fairbanks offers an online course called Beginning Iñupiaq Eskimo, an introductory course to the Iñupiaq language open to both speakers and non-speakers of Iñupiaq. University of Alaska Anchorage offers multiple levels of Elementary Iñupiaq Language and Alaskan Native language apprenticeship and fluency intensive courses.

Since 2017, a grassroots group of Iñupiat language learners organized Iḷisaqativut, a two-week Iñupiaq language intensive that is held throughout communities in the Iñupiat region. The first gathering was held in Utqiaġvik in 2017, Siqnasuaq (Nome) in 2018, and Qikiqtaġruk (Kotzebue) in 2019.

Kawerak, a nonprofit organization from the Bering Strait region, has created a language glossary that features terms from Iñupiaq, as well as terms from English, Yup'ik, and St. Lawrence Island Yupik.

Several Inupiat people developed pictographic writing systems in the early twentieth century. It is known as Alaskan Picture Writing.

History
Along with other Inuit groups, the Iñupiaq originate from the Thule culture. Circa 300 B.C., the Thule migrated from islands in the Bering Sea to what now is Alaska.

Iñupiaq groups, in common with Inuit-speaking groups, often have a name ending in "miut," which means 'a people of'. One example is the Nunamiut, a generic term for inland Iñupiaq caribou hunters. During a period of starvation and an influenza epidemic (likely introduced by American and European whaling crews,) most of these people moved to the coast or other parts of Alaska between 1890 and 1910. A number of Nunamiut returned to the mountains in the 1930s.

By 1950, most Nunamiut groups, such as the Killikmiut, had coalesced in Anaktuvuk Pass, a village in north-central Alaska. Some of the Nunamiut remained nomadic until the 1950s.

The Iditarod Trail's antecedents were the native trails of the Dena'ina and Deg Hit'an Athabaskan Indians and the Iñupiaq people.

Subsistence

Iñupiat people are hunter-gatherers, as are most Arctic peoples. Iñupiat people continue to rely heavily on subsistence hunting and fishing. Depending on their location, they harvest walrus, seal, whale, polar bears, caribou, and fish. Both the inland (Nunamiut) and coastal (Taġiumiut, i.e. Tikiġaġmiut) Iñupiat depend greatly on fish. Throughout the seasons, when they are available, food staples also include 
ducks, geese, rabbits, berries, roots, and shoots.

The inland Iñupiat also hunt caribou, Dall sheep, grizzly bear, and moose. The coastal Iñupiat hunt walrus, seals, beluga whales, and bowhead whales. Cautiously, polar bear also is hunted.

The capture of a whale benefits each member of an Iñupiat community, as the animal is butchered and its meat and blubber are allocated according to a traditional formula. Even city-dwelling relatives, thousands of miles away, are entitled to a share of each whale killed by the hunters of their ancestral village. Maktak, which is the skin and blubber of bowhead and other whales, is rich in vitamins A and C. The vitamin C content of meats is destroyed by cooking, so consumption of raw meats and these vitamin-rich foods contributes to good health in a population with limited access to fruits and vegetables.

A major value within subsistence hunting is the utilization of the whole catch or animal. This is demonstrated in the utilization of the hides to turn into clothing, as seen with seal skin, moose and caribou hides, polar bear hides. Fur from rabbits, beaver, marten, otter, and squirrels are also utilized to adorn clothing for warmth. These hides and furs are used to make parkas, mukluks, hats, gloves, and slippers. Qiviut is also gathered as Muskox shed their underlayer of fur and it is spun into wool to make scarves, hats, and gloves. The use of the animal's hides and fur have kept Iñupiat warm throughout the harsh conditions of their homelands, as many of the materials provide natural waterproof or windproof qualities. Other animal parts that have been utilized are the walrus intestines that are made into dance drums and qayaq or umiaq, traditional skin boats.

The walrus tusks of ivory and the baleen of bowhead whales are also utilized as Native expressions of art. The use of these sensitive materials are inline with the practice of utilizing the gifts from the animals that are subsisted. There are protective policies on the harvesting of walrus and whales. The harvest of walrus solely for the use of ivory is highly looked down upon as well as prohibited by federal law with lengthy and costly punishments.

Since the 1970s, oil and other resources have been an important revenue source for the Iñupiat. The Alaska Pipeline connects the Prudhoe Bay wells with the port of Valdez in south-central Alaska. Because of the oil drilling in Alaska's arid north, however, the traditional way of whaling is coming into conflict with one of the modern world's most pressing demands: finding more oil.

The Iñupiat eat a variety of berries and when mixed with tallow, make a traditional dessert.  They also mix the berries with rosehips and highbush cranberries and boil them into a syrup.

Culture

Traditionally, some Iñupiat people lived in sedentary communities, while others were nomadic. Some villages in the area have been occupied by indigenous groups for more than 10,000 years.

The Nalukataq is a spring whaling festival among Iñupiat. The festival celebrates traditional whale hunting and honors the whale's spirit as it gave its physical body to feed entire villages. The whale's spirit is honored by dance groups from across the North performing songs and dances.

The Iñupiat Ilitqusiat is a list of values that define Iñupiat people. It was created by elders in Kotzebue, Alaska, yet the values resonate with and have been articulated similarly by other Iñupiat communities. These values include: respect for elders, hard work, hunter's success, family roles, humor, respect for nature, knowledge of family tree, respect for others, sharing, love for children, cooperation, avoid conflict, responsibility to tribe, humility, and spirituality.

These values serve as guideposts of how Iñupiat are to live their lives. They inform and can be derived from Iñupiat subsistence practices.

There is one Iñupiat culture-oriented institute of higher education, Iḷisaġvik College, located in Utqiaġvik.

Current issues 
Iñupiat people have grown more concerned in recent years that climate change is threatening their traditional lifestyle. The warming trend in the Arctic affects their lifestyle in numerous ways, for example: thinning sea ice makes it more difficult to harvest bowhead whales, seals, walrus, and other traditional foods as it changes the migration patterns of marine mammals that rely on iceflows and the thinning sea ice can result in people falling through the ice; warmer winters make travel more dangerous and less predictable as more storms form; later-forming sea ice contributes to increased flooding and erosion along the coast as there is an increase in fall storms, directly imperiling many coastal villages. The Inuit Circumpolar Council, a group representing indigenous peoples of the Arctic, has made the case that climate change represents a threat to their human rights.

As of the 2000 U.S. Census, the Iñupiat population in the United States numbered more than 19,000. Most of them live in Alaska.

Iñupiat Nunaat (Iñupiat territories) 

The North Slope Borough has the following cities Anaktuvuk Pass (Anaqtuuvak, Naqsraq), Atqasuk (Atqasuk), Utqiaġvik (Utqiaġvik, Ukpiaġvik), Kaktovik (Qaaktuġvik), Nuiqsut (Nuiqsat), Point Hope (Tikiġaq), Point Lay (Kali), Wainwright (Ulġuniq)

The Northwest Arctic Borough has the following cities Ambler (Ivisaappaat), Buckland (Nunatchiaq, Kaŋiq), Deering (Ipnatchiaq), Kiana (Katyaak, Katyaaq), Kivalina (Kivalliñiq), Kobuk (Laugviik), Kotzebue (Qikiqtaġruk), Noatak (Nuataaq ), Noorvik (Nuurvik), Selawik (Siilvik, Akuligaq ), Shungnak (Isiŋnaq, Nuurviuraq)

The Nome Census Area has the following cities Brevig Mission (Sitaisaq, Sinauraq), Diomede (Iŋalik), Golovin (Siŋik), Koyuk (Kuuyuk), Nome (Siqnazuaq, Sitŋasuaq), Shaktoolik (Saqtuliq), Shishmaref (Qigiqtaq), Teller (Tala, Iġaluŋniaġvik), Wales (Kiŋigin), White Mountain (Natchirsvik), Unalakleet (Uŋalaqłiq)

Notable Iñupiat

 William L. Iggiagruk Hensley (b. 1941) advocate for Native Alaskan rights and U.S. politician
 Ada Blackjack (née Delutuk; 1898–1983), lived for two years as a castaway on uninhabited Wrangel Island north of Siberia.
 Edna Ahgeak MacLean (b. 1944), Inupiaq linguist, anthropologist and educator
 Eileen MacLean (1949–1996), Alaska state legislator and educator
 Andrew Okpeaha MacLean, writer, director and filmmaker, known for On the Ice
 Eddie Ahyakak (b. 1977), Iñupiaq marathon runner and expert mountaineer on Season Two on Ultimate Survival Alaska.
 Irene Bedard (b. 1967), actress
 Ticasuk Brown (1904–1982), educator, poet and writer
 Charles "Etok" Edwardsen, Jr. (1943—2015), Alaska Native land settlement activist
 Ronald Senungetuk (1933—2020), sculptor, silversmith, educator
 Joseph E. Senungetuk (b. 1940), writer and artist, author of Give or Take a Century: An Eskimo Chronicle
 William Oquilluk (1896–1972) author of People of Kauwerak – Legends of the Northern Eskimo, storyteller
 Allison Akootchook Warden (b. 1971) is an internationally celebrated new genre artist
 Kenneth Utuayuk Toovak (1923—2009) ice scientist, Iñupiat spiritualist and scientist
 Sonya Kelliher-Combs (b. 1969) is a mixed media artist of Inupiaq, Athabascan, German and Irish heritage.
 Agnes Hailstone, profiled in the National Geographic documentary television series Life Below Zero
 Sadie Neakok, first female magistrate in Alaska
 Ray Mala (1906–1952), actor
 Joan Kane, poet
 dg nanouk okpik, poet
 James Dommek Jr., writer and musician, author of Midnight Son
 Alice Qannik Glenn (b. 1989), podcaster and producer
 Howard Rock (1911–1976), advocate for Alaska Native land claims, writer, and founder of the Tundra Times
 Tara Sweeney, 13th Assistant Secretary of the Interior for Indian Affairs
 Ariel Tweto (b. 1987), TV personality, producer and actress, known for her roles on Flying Wild Alaska and Native Shorts, a talk show supported by the Sundance Institute and FNX | First Nations Experience.
 John Baker (musher), dog musher, pilot and motivational speaker
 Shirley Reilly, Team USA athlete, 4-time medalist in the Paralympic Games
 Eben Hopson, American politician and founder of the Inuit Circumpolar Council
 Josiah Patkotak, American politician, member of the Alaska House of Representatives

See also
 Baleen basketry
 Eskimo yo-yo
 Kivgiq, Messenger Feast
 Maniilaq
 Never Alone – a video game featuring Iñupiaq folklore
 Qargi, men's community house

References

Further reading
 Heinrich, Albert Carl. A Summary of Kinship Forms and Terminologies Found Among the Inupiaq Speaking People of Alaska. 1950.
 Sprott, Julie E. Raising Young Children in an Alaskan Iñupiaq Village; The Family, Cultural, and Village Environment of Rearing. West, CT: Bergin & Garvey, 2002. 
 Chance, Norman A. The Eskimo of North Alaska. Holt, Rinehart and Winston, 1966. 
 Chance, Norman A. The Inupiat and Arctic Alaska: An Ethnology of Development. Holt, Rinehart and Winston, 1990. 
 Chance, N.A. and Yelena Andreeva. "Sustainability, Equity, and Natural Resource Development in Northwest Siberia and Arctic Alaska." Human Ecology. 1995, vol 23 (2) [June]

External links

 Iñupiat of Arctic Alaska

Indigenous peoples in the Arctic
Alaska Native ethnic groups
Chukchi Sea
Inuit groups